Shipsy Rana is an Indian television actress. She is known for her playing Rukhsar Sheikh in Ishq Subhan Allah. She won ITA Award for Best Actress in a Negative Role for her role in Ishq Subhan Allah in 2018.

Television

Awards and nominations

References

External links

Living people
Indian television actresses
Indian soap opera actresses
Actresses in Hindi television
21st-century Indian actresses
Place of birth missing (living people)
Year of birth missing (living people)